The sixth Brunswick football championship was held in 1909–10 and was organized by the Northern German Football Association. Eintracht Braunschweig won the championship and qualified for the 1909–10 Northern German Football Championship. There, the club defeated Hannover 96 in the quarter-finals and lost to SV Werder Bremen in the semi-finals.

Eintracht Braunschweig II withdrew from the competition.

Final Results

External links
 fussball-historie
 Euroleagues

Sport in Braunschweig
Brunswick
20th century in Braunschweig